Edward Ker Mulgan (1857 – 14 November 1920) was a New Zealand farmer, author, newspaper editor, teacher and school inspector. He was born in Ballynahinch, County Down, Ireland in about 1857.

He is the father of Alan Edward Mulgan and grandfather of John Mulgan.

Published works
 The New Zealand Nature-Study Book: A Guide to the Nature Study Section of the New Syllabus (1905)
 The New Zealand Citizen: An Elementary Account of the Citizen's Rights and Duties and the Work of Government (with Alan Mulgan) (1914, and later editions)

References

1857 births
1920 deaths
New Zealand farmers
New Zealand schoolteachers
People from Ballynahinch, County Down
19th-century New Zealand educators
19th-century New Zealand writers
19th-century male writers
Irish emigrants to New Zealand (before 1923)
20th-century New Zealand writers
20th-century New Zealand male writers